Germania (minor planet designation: 241 Germania) is a very large main-belt asteroid. It is classified as a B-type asteroid and is probably composed of dark, primitive carbonaceous material.

It was discovered by Robert Luther on 12 September 1884 in Düsseldorf.

Germania is the Latin name for Germany.

References

External links
 The Asteroid Orbital Elements Database
 Minor Planet Discovery Circumstances
 Asteroid Lightcurve Data File
 
 

Background asteroids
Germania
Germania
CP-type asteroids (Tholen)
B-type asteroids (SMASS)
18840912